Ashok Chhaviram Argal (born 1 January 1969) is an Indian politician and a member of the Bharatiya Janata Party (BJP). In 1996, he was elected to the 11th Lok Sabha from Morena constituency in Madhya Pradesh. In 1998, 1999 and 2004, he was re-elected to the Lok Sabha from the same constituency. In 2009, he was re-elected to the Lok Sabha from Bhind constituency in Madhya Pradesh graduate in 2008-09 from Chitrakoot gramoday Vishwavidyalaya.

Political career
In the 2009 election he was elected to the 15th Lok Sabha from the Bhind Lok Sabha constituency of Madhya Pradesh.

Personal life
Argal is married to Smt Suman Argal and has 4 sons.

References

External links
 Members of Fourteenth Lok Sabha - Parliament of India website

Living people
1969 births
People from Morena
India MPs 2004–2009
India MPs 2009–2014
India MPs 1996–1997
India MPs 1998–1999
India MPs 1999–2004
People from Bhind
People from Morena district
Bharatiya Janata Party politicians from Madhya Pradesh
Lok Sabha members from Madhya Pradesh